Percival is a Knight of the Round Table in the King Arthur legend.

Percival, Perceval, or similar names may also refer to:

Arthurian legend
Perceval, the Story of the Grail (French: Le Conte du Graal), 12th century romance by Chrétien de Troyes
Perceval le Gallois, 1978 French film adaptation of Chrétien's work
Parzival, the 13th century romance by Wolfram von Eschenbach

People

People with the given name 

 Percival G. Baldwin 1880–1936), American businessman and politician
 Percival Chubb, proposed the official Flag of St. Louis
 Percival Drayton (1812–1865), United States Navy officer
 Perceval Gaillard (born 1983), French politician
 Percival Gunasekera, Sri Lankan Sinhala lawyer and diplomat
 Percival Lowell (1855–1916), American astronomer

People with the surname 
Alexander Perceval (1788–1858), British politician
 Anne Mary Perceval, daughter of Sir Charles Flower, 1st Baronet
Armand-Pierre Caussin de Perceval (1795–1871), French orientalist
Arthur Percival (1887–1966), British Lieutenant General
Brian Percival, British film director
Darren Percival, Australian musical artist
Edgar Percival (1897–1984), Australian aircraft designer, pilot, Percival Aircraft
Harold W. Percival (1868–1953), writer, theosophist
James Percival (assemblyman), member of the New York State Legislature in 1831
James Percival (rugby union) (b. 1983), English rugby player
James Gates Percival (1796–1856), American poet and geologist
John Perceval (disambiguation), various people with the name
John Percival (disambiguation), various people with the name
Kylie Percival, Australian archivist
Lance Percival (1933–2015), British actor and comedian
Launcelot Percival (1869–1941), British cleric and international rugby player
Nathaniel Knight-Percival (born 1987), English football player for Shrewsbury Town FC
Mark Percival (born 1994), English professional rugby league footballer
Olive Percival (1869–1945), American gardening writer
Peter Percival (1803–1882), a British born missionary and educator
Ria Percival (born 1989), New Zealand footballer
Richard Percivale (1550–1620), English Hispanist, grammarian and lexicographer
Spencer Perceval (1762–1812), British statesman and Prime Minister
Thomas Percival (1740–1804), English physician
Troy Percival (born 1969), American baseball player
Westby Perceval (1854–1928), New Zealand politician
William Perceval (fl. 1703–1735), Irish priest

Fictional characters
Mr Percival, the pelican in the 1976 Australian movie, Storm Boy
Mr Percival, a human character in Thomas & Friends
Percival "Perry" Ulysses Cox, character in the 2001–2010 American television show Scrubs
Percival C. McLeach, the main villain in the 1990 Disney film The Rescuers Down Under
Percival Graves, in the film Fantastic Beasts and Where to Find Them
Percival "Percy" Fredrickstein Von Musel Klossowski de Rolo III, a character portrayed by Taliesin Jaffe in the series Critical Role

Other uses
Percival, Iowa, unincorporated town in the United States
Percival, Saskatchewan, former hamlet in Canada
Percival (band), Polish folk band
Perceval (sculpture), a public sculpture by British artist Sarah Lucas
Percival Street, in the East Point and Wan Chai, Hong Kong
Percival Aircraft, a British aircraft manufacturer in the 1950s, now known as Hunting Aircraft
USS Percival, a list of ships by this name

See also
 Percevault, a surname
 
Parsifal (disambiguation)

English-language surnames 
English masculine given names